Edaphodon mirificus is a species of Edaphodon, which was found by Joseph Leidy (September 9, 1823 – April 30, 1891) in 1856, in Hornerstown, New Jersey.

References

Callorhinchidae